The Bridgecard EP is an extended play by American rapper Shim-E-Bango and his first solo recording since his participation with The Fat Killahz, who made guest appearances in this album along with fellow Detroit-based rappers Guilty Simpson, Miz Korona, Moe Dirdee, and Invy Da Truth.

Bango collaborates with Chanes who delivered production work on the entire record. The Bridgecard EP released as a free digital download album.

In September 2011, BangO dropped a single "Al Bundy", which named after character of U.S. television series Married... with Children.

Track listing

References

External links 

2011 EPs
Fat Killahz albums
Underground hip hop albums
Albums free for download by copyright owner